Empire Breeze was a  cargo ship which was built in 1940 for the Ministry of War Transport (MoWT). Shortly after entering service she ran aground but was repaired.

Description
Empire Breeze was built by J L Thompson & Sons Ltd, Sunderland. She was yard number 603. Launched on 3 October 1940, she was completed in January 1941.

The engine was built by George Clarke (1938) Ltd, Sunderland. Empire Breeze was armed with a 4" gun, a 20mm AA gun and two twin machine guns.

Career

Empire Breeze's port of registry was Sunderland. She was operated under the management of J & J Denholm Ltd, Sunderland. On 5 February 1941, she ran aground on the Bondicar Rocks, off Amble, Northumberland. She was refloated on 13 March and taken in tow by the tug Bullger, but the tug struck a mine and sank in Druridge Bay. Empire Breeze was anchored off Cresswell and later taken to Sunderland for repairs. She was a member of a number of convoys during the Second World War.

ON 37
Convoy ON 37 departed from Liverpool on 15 November 1941 and dispersed at sea on 24 November.

ON 122
Convoy ON 122 departed from Liverpool on 15 August 1942 and dispersed at sea on 3 September. Two torpedoes struck Empire Breeze, killing one crew member. She began to settle by the stern. The captain of U-438 claimed the kill, but postwar analysis shows that it was U-176 which had fired the fatal shot. The surviving crew abandoned ship, but later reboarded her and sent distress signals after repairing the radio set. On 27 August, the Irish merchant ship  rescued the 42 surviving crew and six DEMS gunners. They were landed at Dunmore East, County Waterford on 1 September. Although Empire Breeze was still afloat on 27 August, she could not be found by HMS Frisky and the search was abandoned on 30 August. Those lost on Empire Breeze are commemorated at the Tower Hill Memorial, London.

Official Numbers and Code Letters

Official Numbers were a forerunner to IMO Numbers. Empire Breeze  had the UK Official Number 168662 and used the Code Letters GPFP.

References

1940 ships
Ships built on the River Wear
Empire ships
Ministry of War Transport ships
Steamships of the United Kingdom
Maritime incidents in February 1941
Maritime incidents in August 1942
Ships sunk by German submarines in World War II
Shipwrecks in the Atlantic Ocean